Antonius Petrus Lambertus "Antoine" Bodar (born December 28, 1944 in 's-Hertogenbosch) is a Dutch Roman Catholic priest, art historian, author of books in the field of culture and church and professor.

Bodar was initially known as a presenter of radio and television programs on KRO. He was then a lecturer at Leiden University and professor in Tilburg. Bodar was ordained a priest at a later age and continued to appear as a creator of his own programs and as a guest in those of others on radio and television. He has numerous books to his name.

Books 

 Liturgie in Traditie: Liturgie volgens Joseph Ratzinger/Benedictus XVI, 2022. ISBN 949326212X

 Vervulling in bekering, 2018.

 Droef gemoed: Nels Fahner in gesprek met Antoine Bodar over depressie, 2018.

 Eeuwigh gaat voor oogenblick: Antoine Bodar in gesprek met Paul Witteman, Adriaan Van Dis, Hilde Kieboom, Hans Wiegel en 12 anderen, 2017.

 Geborgen in traditie, 2016.

 Kerstverhalen -: gekozen door Antoine Bodar, 2014.
 Verkoren en veracht, 2011.
 Tot dienen geroepen, 2010.
 Uit de eeuwige stad, 2008.
 Romeinse brieven, 2007.
 Nochtans zal ik juichen, 2007.
 Ik droom mij Europa: inaugurale rede bij de aanvaarding van het ambt van bijzonder hoogleraar vanwege de Stichting Hieronymus met als leeropdracht ... de universiteit vanTilburg op 2 februari 2007, 2007.
 In zwakheid krachtig, 2004.
 Klokkenluider van Sint Jan, 2004.
 Weten Waar de Muze Woont, 1998.
 Drinken van de beker, 1997.
 Geheim van het geloof, 1996.
 Eeuwigh gaat voor Oogenblick, 1996.
 Gezellin van de Stilte, 1996.
 Wandelen met de Heer, 1994.

References

External links
Official website
1944 births
Living people

20th-century Dutch Roman Catholic priests
Dutch art historians
Academic staff of Leiden University
21st-century Dutch male writers
21st-century Dutch writers